Christopher Larkin (born October 2, 1987) is an American actor. He is best known for playing the role of Monty Green on the CW series The 100.

Early life 
Larkin was born in Daegu, South Korea. At four months old, he was adopted by Elaine and Peter Larkin. He grew up in Hebron, Connecticut, US, and his upbringing was rich with his father's Irish culture. Christopher was a competitive Irish step-dancer throughout his youth – nationally ranked – and cites his first dream as wanting to be "the Asian American lead on Riverdance." He began acting in his middle school's drama program, and obtained his first professional role in 2000 as the lead in Hallmark Hall of Fame's Flamingo Rising. He also began playing guitar after being gifted one by his grandfather.

After graduating from both RHAM High School and the Greater Hartford Academy of the Arts in 2005, Larkin attended Fordham University's campus at Lincoln Center in New York City. He made his off-Broadway debut in his sophomore year of college and took off the fall semester of his senior year to play the title character in Steppenwolf Theatre Company's production of Kafka on the Shore in Chicago, Illinois. Larkin graduated with his theater degree in 2009 and moved to LA in 2012 in hopes of finding more acting opportunities.

Music 
In 2011, Christopher Larkin founded the band d'Artagnon with friend Wade Allain-Marcus. D'Artagnon has released one studio album entitled A-side. Off this album, their song "Confession" was featured in episode 2x06 of the 100 and was named winner of the 2012 Red Bull Soundstage Competition, as well as being on the soundtrack of the film We Made This Movie. Nowadays, Larkin releases music under the moniker Carry Hatchet. He self-released his debut album The News Today on September 29, 2015. His second album, The Happiest Album Ever Made, was released on November 13, 2017, with "Julien" and "Grey Blues" released early as singles. He also released a music video for "Grey Blues". His third album, "Jayne Schmayne", was released May 4, 2021. Off that album, the songs "Round and Round", "Theo", and "Only a Fool" were released early as singles with accompanying music videos.

Acting

Film

Theatre

Television

References

External links 

1987 births
American male actors of Korean descent
American adoptees
American male film actors
American male television actors
People from Daegu
Living people
Male actors from Connecticut
American people of South Korean descent
People from Hebron, Connecticut
21st-century American male actors